The Suzuki Swift Sport Cup is a one-make racing series in New Zealand. The series is made up of Suzuki Swift's sourced through Winger Motor Group in Hamilton, Waikato region. The series is designed to be an inexpensive way for young drivers to get into tin-top racing. Built on the standard production Suzuki Swift Super 1600 with class rules set by Motor Sport New Zealand, the cars are race-modified to set specifications to ensure even competition.

Previous championship winners
The championship first started in 2007/08, when the championship ran alongside the New Zealand Production Championship. In 2009/10, the series became its on championship running separate races from the Production Championship.

In the series' short history, there has only ever been one two-time winner; Cody McMaster in 2007/08 and 2008/09.

Suzuki Swift Sport Cup graduates
Drivers that started on the National Circuit in the Swift Series include:

V8SuperTourer Support Category
In 2013, the championship will go from supporting the New Zealand V8s in the summer, to supporting the V8SuperTourer series in a year-long series. This will help with the development of the young driver, and increase the opportunity for young drivers to reach the top level of motorsport in New Zealand. Drivers who graduate the Swift Cup, can now easily step into the V8 Challenge Cup to develop their V8 skills before stepping into the V8SuperTourer. Former Swift Cup driver Mark Gibson is currently following this path.

The deal with V8SuperTourer will see the Suzuki's not running on Dunlop tyres for the first time in the series history. They will be changing over to Hankook tyres.

References

 
One-make series
Auto racing series in New Zealand